Corinth, Arkansas may refer to the following places in Arkansas:
Corinth, Arkansas, a town in Yell County
Corinth, Bradley County, Arkansas, an unincorporated community
Corinth, Howard County, Arkansas, an unincorporated community
Corinth, Polk County, Arkansas, an unincorporated community